Patissa minima is a moth in the family Crambidae. It was described by Inoue in 1995. It is found in China (Anhui, Jiangxi, Fujian, Guangxi) and Japan.

The forewings are white with pale yellow fasciae.

References

Moths described in 1995
Schoenobiinae